Sebiastião dos Santos (23 September 1936 – 22 August 1972), known as Tião Macalé, was a Brazilian footballer. He played in five matches for the Brazil national football team in 1963. He was also part of Brazil's squad for the 1963 South American Championship.

References

External links
 

1936 births
1972 deaths
Brazilian footballers
Brazil international footballers
Association football midfielders
Sportspeople from Niterói